Baracchi is an Italian surname. Notable people with the surname include:

Michelangelo Baracchi Bonvicini, Italian British writer 
Nico Baracchi (1957–2015), Swiss bobsledder and skeleton racer
Pietro Baracchi (1851–1926), Italian-born Australian astronomer
Raffaella Baracchi (born 1964), Italian actress and Miss Italia 1983

See also
Trofeo Baracchi or the Baracchi Trophy, a major Italian cycling race starting the 1940s until 1991

Italian-language surnames